Kim Chang-bok (born October 14, 1959) is a North Korean football coach who managed the North Korea national football team from 2015 to 2016. He replaced Jo Tong-sop in the role after the 2015 AFC Asian Cup. Kim was replaced a year later by Jørn Andersen.

In January 2016, he was named number 9 of North Korea's ten best coaches (across all sports) of 2015.

References

1959 births
Living people
North Korea national football team managers
North Korean football managers